is a railway station in Chūō-ku, Sapporo, Hokkaido, Japan, operated by the Hokkaido Railway Company (JR Hokkaido). The station is numbered S02.

Lines
Sōen Station is served by the Hakodate Main Line and also the Sasshō Line (Gakuentoshi Line) from Sapporo.

Station layout
The elevated station has two island platforms serving four tracks. The station has automated ticket machines, automated turnstiles which accept Kitaca, and a "Midori no Madoguchi" staffed ticket office.

Platforms

Adjacent stations

History
The station opened on 1 June 1924.

Surrounding area
 JR Hokkaido Head Office
 JR Freight Hokkaido branch
 Sapporo City Hospital
 Sapporo Racecourse
 Sapporo City University

See also
 List of railway stations in Japan

References

External links

 Station information and map 

Railway stations in Sapporo
Railway stations in Japan opened in 1924
Chūō-ku, Sapporo